Timofey Ilyich Prokofiev (2 February 1913 – March 1944) was a Soviet marine of the Black Sea Fleet during World War II.

Biography
Timofey Prokofiev was born on 2 February 1913, in the village of Lukianovo, Ostashkovsky District, Tver Oblast, Russian Empire; into a family of peasants of Roma origin. After completing his primary education he went on to work as a sailor on the Moscow Canal.

On 22 June 1941 Germany invaded of the Soviet Union during World War II. Prokofiev enlisted in the Soviet Navy in January 1942 and was assigned to the 384th Naval Infantry Battalion of the Black Sea Fleet. The landing was a diversionary attack on the German rear at Nikolaev led by Senior Lieutenant Konstantin Olshansky. The 68 Soviet marines managed to capture several buildings in Nikolaev's port, repelling 18 German attacks within a span of two days. Prokofiev was among the marines who were killed in action.

Prokofiev was buried in a mass grave located on the 68 Marines Square in Nikolaev. On 25 April 1945, Prokofiev was posthumously awarded the title Hero of the Soviet Union along with the Order of Lenin, the only Roma to have ever received the former award. A museum and a statue dedicated to the participants of the Olshansky Landing were created in Nikolaev during Soviet times.

Footnotes

References
 
 
 

1913 births
1944 deaths
Soviet military personnel killed in World War II
Heroes of the Soviet Union
People from Ostashkovsky District
Russian Romani people
Recipients of the Order of Lenin